The principal stock index of the Ghana Stock Exchange or GSE is the GSE Composite Index. It was introduced in 2011 with a base value of 1000 points. This index is calculated from the values of each of the market's listings.

Market listings

Profiles of listed companies

AADs
AADs is symbol representing AngloGold Ashanti Limited on the Ghana Stock Exchange. It was listed on the Stock Exchange on 27 April 2004. Its traded securities are ordinary shares of no par value. AADs has a total of four million (4,000,000) authorised shares and 978,000 issued shares. As of 19 August 2014, its stated capital was US $3,364,000,000.

ACI
ACI is symbol representing African Champion Industries Limited on the Ghana Stock Exchange. It was listed on the Stock Exchange on 2 May 1992. Its traded securities are ordinary shares of no par value. ACI has a total of 500 million authorised shares and 36.603 million issued shares. As of 19 August 2014, its stated capital was GH¢1,505.455.

AGA
AGA is symbol representing AngloGold Ashanti Limited on the Ghana Stock Exchange. It was listed on the Stock Exchange on 27 April 2004. Its traded securities are ordinary shares of no par value. AGA has a total of six million (600,000,000) authorised shares and 403,364,237 issued shares. As of 19 August 2014, its stated capital was ZAR 49,342,276,064.06.

ALW
ALW is symbol representing Aluworks Ltd. on the Ghana Stock Exchange. It was listed on the Stock Exchange on 29 November 2004. Its traded securities are ordinary shares of no par value. ALW has a total of one billion (1,000,000,000) authorised shares and 236,687,001 issued shares. As of 19 August 2014, its stated capital was GH¢31,650,000.

AYRTN
AYRTN is symbol representing Ayrton Drugs Manufacturing Company Ltd. on the Ghana Stock Exchange. It was listed on the Stock Exchange on 27 April 2004. Its traded securities are equity. AYRTN has a total of 500,000,000 authorised shares and 180,000,000 issued shares. As of 19 August 2014, its stated capital was GH¢1500.

BOPP
BOPP is symbol representing Benso Oil Palm Plantation Limited on the Ghana Stock Exchange. It was listed on the Stock Exchange on 16 April 2004. Its traded securities are ordinary shares of no par value. BOPP has a total of 50,000,000 authorised shares of no par value and 34,800,000 issued shares. As of 19 August 2014, its stated capital was GH¢2,000,000.

CAL
CAL is symbol representing CAL Bank Limited on the Ghana Stock Exchange. It was listed on the Stock Exchange on 5 November 2004. Its traded securities are ordinary shares of no par value. CAL has a total of one billion (1,000,000,000) authorised shares and 548,261,549 issued shares. As of 19 August 2014, its stated capital was GH¢100,000,000.

CLYD
CLYD is symbol representing Clydestone Limited on the Ghana Stock Exchange. It was listed on the Stock Exchange on 19 May 2004. Its traded securities are ordinary shares of no par value. CYLD has a total of one hundred million (100,000,000) authorised shares of no par value and 5,548,500,000 issued shares. As of 19 August 2014, its stated capital was GH¢554,850.

CMLT
CMLT is symbol representing Camelot Ghana Limited on the Ghana Stock Exchange. It was listed on the Stock Exchange on 17 September 1999. Its traded securities are ordinary shares of no par value. CMLT has a total of twenty million (20,000,000) authorised shares and 6,829,276 issued shares. As of 19 August 2014, its stated capital was GH¢217,467.

CPC
CPC is symbol representing Cocoa Processing Company on the Ghana Stock Exchange. It was listed on the Stock Exchange on 14 February 2003. Its traded securities are ordinary shares of no par value. CPC has a total of 20,000,000,000 authorised shares and 1,100,826,240 issued shares. As of 19 August 2014, its stated capital was GH¢16,778,315.

EGH
EGH is symbol representing Ecobank Ghana Limited on the Ghana Stock Exchange. It was listed on the Stock Exchange in July 2006. Its traded securities are ordinary shares. EGH has a total of 500 million authorised shares and 293,228,372 issued shares. As of 19 August 2014, its stated capital was GH¢226.64 million.

EGL
EGL is symbol representing Enterprise Group Limited on the Ghana Stock Exchange. It was listed on the Stock Exchange on 21 February 1992. Its traded securities are ordinary shares of no par value. EGL has a total of 200 million authorised shares and 131,210,825 issued shares. As of 19 August 2014, its stated capital was GH¢31,599,000.00.

ETI
ETI is symbol representing Ecobank Transnational Incorporation on the Ghana Stock Exchange. It was listed on the Stock Exchange on 11 September 2006. Its traded securities are equities. ETI has a total of 800,000,000 authorised shares and 17,213 Billion issued shares. As of 19 August 2014, its stated capital was US$867,714,000.

FML
FML is symbol representing Fan Milk Limited on the Ghana Stock Exchange. It was listed on the Stock Exchange on 18 October 1991. Its traded securities are ordinary shares of no par value. FML has a total of 200 million authorised shares and 118,707,288 issued shares. As of 19 August 2014, its stated capital was GH¢10,000,000.00.

GCB
GCB is symbol representing Ghana Commercial Bank Limited on the Ghana Stock Exchange. It was listed on the Stock Exchange on 17 May 1996. Its traded securities are ordinary shares of no par value. GCB has 1,500,000,000 authorised shares and 	265,000,000 issued shares. As of 19 August 2014, its stated capital was GH¢72,000,000.

GGBL
GGBL is symbol representing Guinness Ghana Breweries Limited on the Ghana Stock Exchange. It was listed on the Stock Exchange on 23 August 1991. Its traded securities are ordinary shares of no par value. EGL has a total of 200 million authorised shares and 211,338,142 issued shares. As of 19 August 2014, its stated capital was GH¢26,252,000.

GOIL
GOIL is symbol representing Ghana Oil Company Limited on the Ghana Stock Exchange. It was listed on the Stock Exchange on 16 November 2007. Its traded securities are ordinary shares of no par value. GOIL has a total of 1,000,000,000 authorised shares and 252.22 million issued shares. As of 19 August 2014, its stated capital was GH¢31,809,265.00.

GSR
GSR is symbol representing Golden Star Resources Limited on the Ghana Stock Exchange. It was listed on the Stock Exchange on 15 February 2008. Its traded securities are ordinary shares of no par value. GSR has Unlimited (Under Canadian Law) authorised shares and 259,105,970 issued shares. As of 19 August 2014, its stated capital was US $520,320,000.

GWEB
GWEB is symbol representing Golden Web Ltd. on the Ghana Stock Exchange. It was listed on the Stock Exchange on 29 August 2005. Its traded securities are ordinary shares of no par value. GWEB has a total of 750,000,000 authorised shares and 29.966,304 issued shares. As of 19 August 2014, its stated capital was GH¢31,809,265.00.

HFC
HFC is symbol representing HFC Bank Limited on the Ghana Stock Exchange. It was listed on the Stock Exchange on 17 March 1995. Its traded securities are ordinary shares of no par value. HFC has a total of 1 billion authorised shares and 296,080,918 issued shares. As of 12 September 2014, its stated capital was GH¢95,000,624.

MAC
MAC is symbol representing Mega African Capital Limited on the Ghana Stock Exchange. It was listed on the Stock Exchange on 23 April 2014. Its traded securities are ordinary shares. MAC has a total of 8,641,469 issued shares. As of 12 September 2014, its stated capital was GH¢11,820,922.

MLC
MLC is symbol representing Mechanical Lloyd Company Limited on the Ghana Stock Exchange. It was listed on the Stock Exchange on 10 May 1994. Its traded securities are ordinary shares of no par value. MLC has a total of 100 million  authorised shares and 50,095,925 issued shares. As of 12 September 2014, its stated capital was GH¢2,771,486.00.

PKL
PKL is symbol representing Pioneer Kitchenware Limited on the Ghana Stock Exchange. It was listed on the Stock Exchange on 25 August 1995. Its traded securities are ordinary shares of no par value. PKL has a total of 100 million  authorised shares and 33.34 million issued shares. As of 12 September 2014, its stated capital was GH¢866,201.

PZC
PZC is symbol representing PZ Cussons Ghana Limited on the Ghana Stock Exchange. It was listed on the Stock Exchange on 12 November 1990. Its traded securities are ordinary shares of no par value. PZC has a total of 200 million  authorised shares and 168,000,000 issued shares. As of 12 September 2014, its stated capital was GH¢2,160,000.

SCB
SCB is symbol representing Standard Chartered Bank Ghana Limited on the Ghana Stock Exchange. It was formally listed on the Stock Exchange on 23 August 1991. Its traded securities are ordinary and preference shares. SCB has a total of 250 million  authorised shares(Ordinary) and issued shares consist of 115,507,284 million ordinary shares and 17,486,083 million preference shares. As of 12 September 2014, its stated capital was GH¢52,541,000 Ordinary Shares and GH¢9,090,000 Preference shares; total is GH¢61,631,000.

SCB PREF
SCB PREF is symbol representing Standard Chartered Bank Ghana Limited on the Ghana Stock Exchange. It was formally listed on the Stock Exchange on 23 August 1991. Its traded securities are ordinary and preference shares. SCB PREF has a total of 250 million  authorised shares(Ordinary) and issued shares consist of 115,507,284 million ordinary shares and 17,486,083 million preference shares. As of 12 September 2014, its stated capital was GH¢52,541,000 Ordinary Shares and GH¢9,090,000 Preference shares; total is GH¢61,631,000.

SIC
SIC is symbol representing SIC Insurance Company Limited on the Ghana Stock Exchange. It was listed on the Stock Exchange on 25 January 2008. Its traded securities are ordinary shares of no par value. SIC has a total of 500 million authorised shares and 195,645,000 issued shares. As of 12 September 2014, its stated capital was GH¢2,500,000.

SOGEGH
SOGEGH is symbol representing Societe Generale Ghana Limited on the Ghana Stock Exchange. It was listed on the Stock Exchange on 13 October 1995. Its traded securities are ordinary shares of no par value. SOGEGH has a total of 500 million authorised shares and 333,393,894 issued shares. As of 12 September 2014, its stated capital was GH¢62,393,557.80.

SPL
SPL is symbol representing Starwin Products Limited on the Ghana Stock Exchange. It was listed on the Stock Exchange on 29 December 2004. Its traded securities are ordinary shares of no par value. SPL has a total of 500 million authorised shares and 74,244,825 issued shares. As of 12 September 2014, its stated capital was GH¢1,982,028.

SWL
SWL is symbol representing Sam Wood Limited on the Ghana Stock Exchange. It was listed on the Stock Exchange on 24 April 2002. SWL has a total of 100 million authorised shares and 21,828,035 issued shares. As of 12 September 2014, its stated capital was GH¢220,990.

TBL
TBL is symbol representing Trust Bank Limited (The Gambia) on the Ghana Stock Exchange. It was listed on the Stock Exchange on 15 November 2002. Its traded securities are ordinary shares of no par value. TBL has a total of 200 million authorised shares and 200,000,000 issued shares. As of 12 September 2014, its stated capital was Dalasis 200,000,000.

TLW
TLW is symbol representing Tullow Oil Plc on the Ghana Stock Exchange. It was listed on the Stock Exchange on 27 July 2011. Its traded securities are ordinary shares of no par value. TLW has a total of 903,846,948 issued shares. As of 12 September 2014, its stated capital was GH¢109,477,926.

TOTAL
TOTAL is symbol representing Total Petroleum Ghana Limited on the Ghana Stock Exchange. It was listed on the Stock Exchange on 19 July 1991. Its traded securities are ordinary shares of no par value. TOTAL has a total of 50 million authorised shares and 13,948,259 issued shares. As of 12 September 2014, its stated capital was GH¢49,722,000.

TRANSOL
TRANSOL is symbol representing Transol Solutions Ghana Limited on the Ghana Stock Exchange. It was listed on the Stock Exchange on 29 December 2006. Its traded securities are equity shares. TRANSOL has a total of 1 billion authorised shares and 80,000,000 issued shares. As of 12 September 2014, its stated capital was GH¢2,150,000.

UNIL
UNIL is symbol representing Unilever Ghana Limited on the Ghana Stock Exchange. It was formally listed on the Stock Exchange on 23 August 1991. UNIL has a total of 100 million authorised shares and 62.5 million issued shares. As of 12 September 2014, its stated capital was GH¢1,200,000.

UTB
UTB is symbol representing UT Bank Limited on the Ghana Stock Exchange. It was listed on the Stock Exchange on 25 November 2008. Its traded securities are ordinary shares of no par value. UTB has a total of 750 million authorised shares and 456,310,181 issued shares. As of 12 September 2014, its stated capital was GH¢85,275,000.

See also
Economy of Ghana
Ghana Stock Exchange
List of African stock exchanges

References

External links
Ghana Stock Exchange
Table of GSE securities, listed by ticker symbol 

African stock market indices
Ghana Stock Exchange
Economy of Ghana